Jijian Rud (also Romanized as Jījīān Rūd and Jījeyānrūd; also known as Jeyjān Rūd) is a village in Haram Rud-e Sofla Rural District, Samen District, Malayer County, Hamadan Province, Iran. At the 2006 census, its population was 274, in 70 families.

References 

Populated places in Malayer County